Gidget is a fictional character created by Frederick Kohner in his 1957 novel Gidget, the Little Girl with Big Ideas.

Gidget may also refer to:

Music
Gidget (EP), a 1993 EP by Good Riddance
Gidget (song), a 1959 song by James Darren

Films and TV
Gidget (film), a 1959 film adaptation starring Sandra Dee
Gidget (TV series), a 1960s sitcom adaptation starring Sally Field
The New Gidget, a 1980s sitcom adaptation starring Caryn Richman

People
Kathy Kohner-Zuckerman (born 1941; nicknamed "Gidget") Kohner's daughter and the inspiration for the fictional character

Fictional characters
Gidget the Super Robot, a character from the Nick Jr. cartoon Wow! Wow! Wubbzy!
Gidget, a white Pomeranian character in the animated feature The Secret Life of Pets.

Other
Gidget (1994-2009), a dog who portrayed the Taco Bell chihuahua in 1990s TV commercials
Gidget, a simplified interface to linux inotify, written in C.